Corinne Le Moal (born 10 November 1954) is a French rower. She competed in the women's single sculls event at the 1992 Summer Olympics.

References

1954 births
Living people
French female rowers
Olympic rowers of France
Rowers at the 1992 Summer Olympics
Sportspeople from Eure